Erzsébet Kocsis (born 11 March 1965) is a Hungarian former handball player and the current technical director of Dunaújvárosi NKS. She was voted IHF World Player of the Year in 1995 by the International Handball Federation.<ref name=ihf>Previous World Handball Players  (Retrieved on December 14, 2007)</ref>

She won 125 caps for the  Hungarian national team between 1986 and 1996, and received a bronze medal at the 1996 Summer Olympics and a silver medal at the 1995 World Championship.

At club level, she won all three major continental titles with Dunaújváros. First in 1995 the EHF Cup Winners' Cup, four years later the EHF Cup, and in 1999 the EHF Champions League. She gave up professional handball in 2000, however, following her former team lost most of their players due to financial problems, she returned into action in 2009, helping Dunaújváros to avoid relegation.

She is married to Árpád Sári, a former handballer. Their daughter, Barbara Sári is also a professional handball player.

Achievements

Club
Nemzeti Bajnokság I:Winner: 1998, 1999
Magyar Kupa:Winner: 1998, 1999
EHF Champions League:Winner: 1999
EHF Cup:Winner: 1998
EHF Cup Winners' Cup:Winner: 1995
EHF Champions Trophy:Winners: 1999Third Placed: 1998Fourth Placed: 1995

International

Olympic Games:Bronze Medalist: 1996
World Championship:Silver Medalist'': 1995

Awards and recognition
 Nemzeti Bajnokság I Top Scorer: 1993
 Hungarian Handballer of the Year: 1992, 1994
 IHF World Player of the Year: 1995

References

External links 
 
 
 

1965 births
Living people
Hungarian female handball players
Olympic handball players of Hungary
Olympic medalists in handball
Olympic bronze medalists for Hungary
Handball players at the 1996 Summer Olympics
Medalists at the 1996 Summer Olympics
Győri Audi ETO KC players
Sportspeople from Győr